This international super-tournament, organised by Nikolai Krylenko, was held at Moscow in the Soviet Union, from 10 November to 8 December 1925. It was the world's first state-sponsored chess tournament. There were eleven foreign stars and ten Soviet masters. World champion José Raúl Capablanca and his predecessor Emanuel Lasker were expected to be the main contenders, as they had been in the New York 1924 chess tournament, but the Soviet master Efim Bogoljubov achieved an unexpected victory. Lasker finished 1½ points behind Bogolyubov and just ahead of Capablanca.

The film Chess Fever used a number of scenes from the tournament, and even featured Capablanca playing himself. The Cuban-Soviet film Capablanca has its main plot during the tournament.

Results
The results and standings:

{|class="wikitable" style="text-align: center"
! # !! Player !! 1 !! 2 !! 3 !! 4 !! 5 !! 6 !! 7 !! 8 !! 9 !! 10 !! 11 !! 12 !! 13 !! 14 !! 15 !! 16 !! 17 !! 18 !! 19 !! 20 !! 21 !! Total
|-
| 1 || align=left |  ||x ||½ ||0 ||½ ||1 ||1 ||0 ||½ ||1 ||1 ||½ ||1 ||1 ||½ ||1 ||1 ||1 ||1 ||1 ||1 ||1  ||15½
|-
| 2 || align=left | ||½ ||x ||½ ||1 ||½ ||0 ||½ ||1 ||½ ||1 ||1 ||1 ||1 ||1 ||0 ||½ ||1 ||½ ||½ ||1 ||1  ||14
|-
| 3 || align=left |  ||1 ||½ ||x ||1 ||1 ||½ ||½ ||½ ||½ ||0 ||1 ||0 ||½ ||½ ||½ ||½ ||1 ||1 ||1 ||1 ||1  ||13½
|-
| 4 || align=left |  ||½ ||0 ||0 ||x ||½ ||0 ||1 ||1 ||½ ||0 ||1 ||1 ||1 ||1 ||1 ||1 ||½ ||0 ||½ ||1 ||1  ||12½
|-
| 5 || align=left |  || 0 ||½ ||0 ||½ ||x ||½ ||1 ||½ ||½ ||½ ||½ ||1 ||1 ||1 ||½ ||1 ||1 ||½ ||½ ||½ ||½  ||12
|-
| 6 || align=left |  || 0 ||1 ||½ ||1 ||½ ||x ||½ ||0 ||½ ||½ ||0 ||1 ||½ ||½ ||1 ||½ ||0 ||1 ||1 ||1 ||1  ||12
|-      
| 7 || align=left |  ||1 ||½ ||½ ||0 ||0 ||½ ||x ||1 ||0 ||1 ||1 ||½ ||0 ||½ ||½ ||1 ||1 ||½ ||1 ||½ ||½  ||11½
|-      
| 8 || align=left |  ||½ ||0 ||½ ||0 ||½ ||1 ||0 ||x ||1 ||0 ||½ ||1 ||0 ||0 ||1 ||1 ||1 ||½ ||1 ||1 ||1  ||11½
|-      
| 9 || align=left |  ||0 ||½ ||½ ||½ ||½ ||½ ||1 ||0 ||x ||1 ||½ ||½ ||½ ||0 ||½ ||1 ||1 ||½ ||½ ||½ ||½  ||10½
|-     
| 10 || align=left |  ||0 ||0 ||1 ||1 ||½ ||½ ||0 ||1 ||0 ||x ||½ ||0 ||1 ||½ ||0 ||½ ||1 ||½ ||½ ||1 ||1  ||10½
|-     
| 11 || align=left |  ||½ ||0 ||0 ||0 ||½ ||1 ||0 ||½ ||½ ||½ ||x ||½ ||½ ||1 ||½ ||1 ||½ ||½ ||½ ||½ ||1  ||10
|-     
| 12 || align=left |  || 0 ||0 ||1 ||0 ||0 ||0 ||½ ||0 ||½ ||1 ||½ ||x ||1 ||1 ||1 ||½ ||0 ||1 ||½ ||1 ||0   ||9½
|-     
| 13 || align=left |  ||  0 ||0 ||½ ||0 ||0 ||½ ||1 ||1 ||½ ||0 ||½ ||0 ||x ||1 ||1 ||½ ||½ ||1 ||½ ||0 ||1   ||9½
|-     
| 14 || align=left |  ||½ ||0 ||½ ||0 ||0 ||½ ||½ ||1 ||1 ||½ ||0 ||0 ||0 ||x ||1 ||0 ||0 ||1 ||1 ||1 ||1  || 9½
|-     
| 15 || align=left |  ||0 ||1 ||½ ||0 ||½ ||0 ||½ ||0 ||½ ||1 ||½ ||0 ||0 ||0 ||x ||1 ||1 ||½ ||½ ||1 ||½   ||9
|-     
| 16 || align=left |  ||0 ||½ ||½ ||0 ||0 ||½ ||0 ||0 ||0 ||½ ||0 ||½ ||½ ||1 ||0 ||x ||1 ||½ ||1 ||1 ||1   ||8½
|-     
| 17 || align=left |  ||0 ||0 ||0 ||½ ||0 ||1 ||0 ||0 ||0 ||0 ||½ ||1 ||½ ||1 ||0 ||0 ||x ||1 ||½ ||0 ||1   ||7
|-     
| 18 || align=left |  || 0 ||½ ||0 ||1 ||½ ||0 ||½ ||½ ||½ ||½ ||½ ||0 ||0 ||0 ||½ ||½ ||0 ||x ||0 ||1 ||0   ||6½
|-     
| 19 || align=left |  ||0 ||½ ||0 ||½ ||½ ||0 ||0 ||0 ||½ ||½ ||½ ||½ ||½ ||0 ||½ ||0 ||½ ||1 ||x ||0 ||½   ||6½
|-     
| 20 || align=left |  ||0 ||0 ||0 ||0 ||½ ||0 ||½ ||0 ||½ ||0 ||½ ||0 ||1 ||0 ||0 ||0 ||1 ||0 ||1 ||x ||1   ||6
|-     
| 21 || align=left |  || 0 ||0 ||0 ||0 ||½ ||0 ||½ ||0 ||½ ||0 ||0 ||1 ||0 ||0 ||½ ||0 ||0 ||1 ||½ ||0 ||x  || 4½
|}

References

Chess competitions
Chess in the Soviet Union
1925 in chess
1925 in the Soviet Union
Sports competitions in Moscow
1925 in Moscow
1925 in Soviet sport